337th may refer to:

337th Aeronautical Systems Group, inactive United States Air Force unit
337th Air Control Squadron, part of the 33d Fighter Wing, an AETC unit, based at the USAF Tyndall Air Force Base, Florida
337th Airlift Squadron, part of the 439th Airlift Wing at Westover Air Reserve Base, Massachusetts
337th Brigade, Royal Field Artillery, part-time unit of the British Army's Royal Artillery from 1860 to 1956
337th Flight Test Squadron, most recently part of the 46th Test Wing and based at McClellan Air Force Base, California
337th Independent Helicopter Regiment, based in Tolmachevo Airport in the town of Ob, Siberia
337th Infantry Division (Wehrmacht), German Army infantry division in World War II
337th Infantry Regiment (United States), National Army Infantry Regiment first organized for service in World War I
337th Rifle Division (Soviet Union), first formed in August 1941, as a standard Red Army rifle division, at Astrakhan
337th Test and Evaluation Squadron, squadron of the United States Air Force
337th Volksgrenadier Division (Wehrmacht), German military unit during World War II

See also
337 (number)
337, the year 337 (CCCXXXVII) of the Julian calendar
337 BC